The Museum of Polish Arms is a museum in Kołobrzeg, Poland. Its main feature is a collection of militaria related to the military of Poland from the early Middle Ages to the present. In addition to its military collection, the museum also has a department focusing on the history of the city of Kołobrzeg.

Notable elements of the museum collection include vehicles like the S600 Sokół motorcycle, several tanks and planes (such as the PZL TS-8 Bies and a Sukhoi Su-22), and Ilyushin Il-28) and the ORP Fala museum ship.

External links

 Muzeum Oręża Polskiego
 Airplanes in the Museum of Polish Arms
 Museum of Polish Arms

Museums established in 1963
Military and war museums in Poland
Museums in West Pomeranian Voivodeship
Museum of Polish Arms
Registered museums in Poland